WNOO (1260 AM) is an urban contemporary/gospel station serving the Chattanooga, Tennessee market, in the United States.

FM translator
In addition to the main station, WNOO is relayed by an FM translator in order to widen the broadcast area, especially at night when WNOO AM reduces power to 25 watts. The FM translator also gives the listener another option, namely FM with high-fidelity sound.

History
On December 30, 1960, Jerry Tucker of WNOO interviewed Dr. Martin Luther King Jr. just before the civil rights leader gave a speech at Chattanooga's Memorial Auditorium.

On January 1, 2006, WTUN started simulcasting with WNOO after its classic country format was moved to WNGA. After a few months of simulcasting with WNOO, WTUN 101.9 then changed their calls to WOCE and is now a Spanish-language broadcaster.

On May 16, 2019, a city construction crew accidentally hit a guy wire to the station's tower causing it to crash down and knock the station off the air. The station set up a temporary tower so it can operate at reduced power and the station continued to broadcast via streaming audio. The city is paying for a replacement tower.

References

External links
 
FCC History Cards for WNOO

NOO
Gospel radio stations in the United States
Radio stations established in 1960
NOO
1960 establishments in Tennessee